Isadora Pompeo (born May 30, 1999) is a Brazilian vlogger, singer and songwriter of Christian music. She released her first studio album, Pra Te Contar os Meus Segredos, produced by Hananiel Eduardo in 2017.

Career 
Known for gospel song covers, Isadora has more than 3 million subscribers and 98 million views on her YouTube channel. Selected by Google as one of the musical bets of the year 2017, she launched, through Musile Records, her first studio album, Pra Te Contar os Meus Segredos.

Discography 

Albums
 Pra Te Contar Os Meus Segredos (2017)
 Processo (2021)
 Aurora (2022)

Singles
 "Deus Perfeito" (2016)
 "Toca em Mim de Novo" (2017)
 "Oi, Jesus" (2017)
 "O Nome de Jesus" (2017)
 "O Teu Amor" (2017)
 "Como Nunca Antes" (2018)
 "Braços de Amor" (2019)
 "Tu És Santo" (2019)
 "História" (2020)
 "Máscaras" feat. João Fiegueiredo (2020)
 "Em troca" (2020)
 "Seja Forte" (2020)
 "Processo" (2020)
 "Sua Paz" (2020)
 "Você não cansa (2020)
 "Primeiro e Último" feat. Arthur Pompeo (2021)
 "Resultado" (2021)
 "Tranquilo" (2021)
 "Primeira Canção (Musica dos Passarinhos)" (2021)
 "Eu tenho Você" feat. Marcelo Markes (2021)
 "Vai Passar" (2021)
 "10 Anos" (2021)
 "Ela brilha (2022)
 "Cuido dos Detalhes" feat. André e Felipe (2022)
 "Casinha favorita" (2022)
 "Tu És Tudo" (2022)
 "Assume a responsa" (2022)
 "Vou me humilhar" (2022)
 "Confio em Ti" feat. Thaiane Seghetto (2022)

Awards and nominations
 Between 2017 and 2019, the artist was nominated and won in several categories in the Gerando Salvação Trophy.

References

1999 births
Living people
Brazilian evangelicals
Brazilian gospel singers
Brazilian YouTubers
People from Caxias do Sul
Performers of contemporary Christian music
21st-century Brazilian singers
21st-century Brazilian women singers